Mushroom Observer is a collaborative mycology website started by Nathan Wilson in 2006. Its purpose is to "record observations about mushrooms, help people identify mushrooms they aren't familiar with, and expand the community around the scientific exploration of mushrooms".

The community of about 10,000 registered users collaborates on identifying the submitted mushroom images, assigning their scientific names by means of a weighted voting process.

All photographs are subject to a Creative Commons license that allows their reuse by others without the need for remuneration or special permission, subject to the terms of the license. The software is open source and hosted on GitHub.

Growth
As of 2018, the website contains about 311,000 user-submitted mushroom observations illustrated by 945,000 photographs. In 2010, the website contained about 53,000 user-submitted mushroom observations illustrated by 101,000 photographs; up from 7,250 observations and 12,800 photographs in 2008. As of November 2018 Mushroom Observer offers approximately 945,000 photos and 311,000 observations of 15,000 species of fungi.

References

External links 
 github.com/MushroomObserver MushroomObserver software under MIT license on GitHub

Mycological literature
Biology websites
Creative Commons-licensed websites
Creative Commons-licensed databases
Internet properties established in 2006
Free software programmed in Ruby
Citizen science